Robert Hilburn (born September 25, 1939) is an American pop music critic, author, and radio host. As critic and music editor at the Los Angeles Times from 1970 to 2005, his reviews, essays and profiles appeared in publications around the world. Hilburn has since written a memoir and best-selling biographies of Johnny Cash and Paul Simon. He was a member of the nominating committee of the Rock and Roll Hall of Fame for more than 20 years and lives in Los Angeles.

Early life
Born in Natchitoches, Louisiana, and lived there until he was 5 mostly on his grandfather’s cotton farm in nearby Campti. During those years and when visiting his grandparents in later summers, he was exposed to the blues and country music styles that eventually gave birth to rock ‘n’ roll. After a few years in Dallas, Texas, he moved with his family to Southern California, where he graduated from Reseda High School in 1957 and California State University, Northridge (journalism degree) in 1961. He worked as a news reporter on a suburban Los Angeles newspaper (the Valley Times TODAY) for two years, but tired of journalism and became a public information officer for the Los Angeles Unified School District in the mid-1960s. While there he began to miss writing around the same time he fell in love with the work of Bob Dylan and the Beatles. Eager to write about music, Hilburn did a series of freelance pieces on such figures as Johnny Cash and Janis Joplin for the Los Angeles Times before being hired full-time by the paper.

The Los Angeles Times

Hilburn began writing at the Los Angeles Times in 1966, replacing Pete Johnson as rock critic in 1970. While at the Times, Hilburn accompanied several artists on landmark tours, including Johnny Cash for his celebrated Folsom Prison concert, Elton John's inaugural visit to Russia, Paul Simon's “Graceland” tour stop in Zimbabwe, and Bob Dylan's first concert swing through Israel. He spent a week on the road with the Sex Pistols during the British band's first U.S. tour. At the Times, Hilburn wrote about the new pop culture movements of punk, techno and rap.

He also wrote extensively about many major figures of pop-rock, including numerous significant interviews with Bob Dylan, David Bowie, Bruce Springsteen, and U2.  Hilburn, too, has been widely credited with helping launch or advance the careers of Elton John, John Prine, Patti Smith, The Eagles, Tom Petty, Prince, Elvis Costello, Guns N' Roses, Rage Against the Machine, Nine Inch Nails, Ice Cube, Public Enemy, Eminem, The White Stripes, Arcade Fire, and X.

Other work

In 1985, Hilburn published a Bruce Springsteen biography as one in a series of Rolling Stone Press books. He released “Corn Flakes with John Lennon” focusing on the work and influence of John Lennon, Bob Dylan, Johnny Cash, Bruce Springsteen, Stevie Wonder, Phil Spector, Michael Jackson, U2, Kurt Cobain and N.W.A.

In 2013, Hilburn published a biography of Johnny Cash titled Johnny Cash: The Life. Michiko Kakutani, the chief book critic of the New York Times, named the biography as one of her 10 favorite books of the year. Kirkus called it, "an instant-classic music biography with something to offer all generations of listeners."

Five years later, Hilburn published a biography of Paul Simon titled Paul Simon: The Life. Author Stephen King praised the book as one of the few works that offered insight into "the creative development of a gifted artist."  Rolling Stone declared the book "epic" and "definitive".

Hilburn hosts a weekly Tuesday evening music program, Rock 'n' Roll Times, on KCSN, a public broadcasting radio station in the Los Angeles area.

Further reading

References

External links
  - roberthilburnonline.com
 

California State University, Northridge alumni
People from Natchitoches, Louisiana
1939 births
American music critics
Living people
Los Angeles Times people
Rock critics